Stade Tata Raphaël (Father Raphael Stadium) is a multi-purpose stadium in Kinshasa, Democratic Republic of the Congo.  Originally known as Stade Roi Baudouin (King Baudouin Stadium) when it was inaugurated in 1952 and Stade du 20 Mai (20 May Stadium) in 1967, it was used mostly for football matches. The stadium has a capacity of 80,000 people.

History
The stadium's most famous event was The Rumble in the Jungle boxing match between Muhammad Ali and George Foreman for the Undisputed WBC/WBA Heavyweight Championship that took place on October 30, 1974. 60,000 people attended the boxing match. In what was ranked as a great upset, Ali knocked out the previously undefeated Foreman in eight rounds. The associated music festival, Zaire 74, that took place at the stadium six weeks prior to the boxing match, included stars James Brown and B.B. King.

Following the downfall of President Mobutu Sese Seko's regime in 1997, the stadium was renamed Stade Tata Raphaël after Raphaël de la Kethulle de Ryhove, initiator of the stadium in 1952.

The stadium was the setting for a documentary film about Congolese women's boxing, Victoire Terminus (2008).

In popular culture
Barbara Kingsolver's novel, The Poisonwood Bible (1998), includes a passage describing the Rumble in the Jungle taking place at the Stade du 20 Mai (20 May Stadium) while political prisoners are locked up downstairs.

References

Sports venues completed in 1952
Football venues in the Democratic Republic of the Congo
Boxing venues in the Democratic Republic of the Congo
Stade Tata Raphael
Multi-purpose stadiums
1952 establishments in the Belgian Congo
Sport in Kinshasa